Van Stadensrus is a settlement in Mangaung Metropolitan Municipality in the Free State province of South Africa.

The settlement is some 30 km south of Wepener and 35 km north-north-west of Zastron. It was laid out on the farm Mook in 1920 and proclaimed in 1925. Named after its founder, M H van Staden, who purchased the farm in 1908 and built the Egmeni or Egmont Dam nearby.

References

Populated places in Mangaung
Populated places established in 1920